The 111th Regiment of Foot (Loyal Birmingham Volunteers) was an infantry regiment of the British Army from 1794 to 1796. It was formed on 30 May 1794 and disbanded in February 1796.

In 1794 the regiment was raised in Birmingham as Robert's Regiment of Foot and posted to Ireland. In August 1795 it was to be posted to the Caribbean to take part in a British invasion of Saint-Domingue. The invasion had already suffered heavy losses to yellow fever. On hearing of the plan, soldiers of the regiment mutinied in Dublin. In February 1796 the regiment was disbanded and its men were transferred to various regiments at Cork bound for the Caribbean.

References

Sources

External links

Infantry regiments of the British Army
Military units and formations established in 1794
Military units and formations disestablished in 1796
1794 establishments in Great Britain
1796 disestablishments in Great Britain